Martina Navratilova was the defending champion, but lost in the quarterfinal to Leila Meskhi. Gabriela Sabatini won the title, defeating Meskhi in the final, 6–1, 6–1.

Seeds 
The top eight seeds received a bye to the second round.

Draw

Finals

Top half

Section 1

Section 2

Bottom half

Section 1

Section 2

References

External links 
 ITF tournament edition details

Virginia Slims of Chicago
Ameritech Cup
Virginia Slims of Chicago